, is a Japanese artist best known as the conceptual character designer for Burst Angel.  More recently, though, he created the main character designs for the anime The Tower of Druaga.  Apart from that, he has worked on the visual novel games Magical Girl AI and Samurai Jupiter.  He publishes doujinshi under the doujin circle name Yellow Tag. In 2005 he attended Anime Expo as a guest of honor.

Works

Anime
Burst Angel – Character design
The Tower of Druaga: The Aegis of Uruk – Character design
The Tower of Druaga: The Sword of Uruk – Character design

Video games
Magical Girl AI – Character design
Samurai Jupiter – Character design

Art books

References

External links
  
 Yellow Tag website (archive, up to 2007) 
 Artman “Artmania” feature (Japanese)— Ugetsu Hakua gallery and interview

1970 births
Living people
Anime character designers